Samuel Ojserkis (born March 24, 1990) is an American rower. He competed in the men's eight event at the 2016 Summer Olympics.

Biography
Samuel Ojserkis was born in the Pomona section of Galloway Township, New Jersey, he grew up in Linwood, New Jersey and graduated from Mainland Regional High School. He earned a degree in geography from the University of Washington in 2012 and a degree in management in 2013 from the University of Cambridge. At the University of Washington, Ojserkis’ crews won 3 National Championships. He was a JV 8+ National Champion in 2010 and won the Varsity 8+ National Championship in 2011 & 2012. At the 2012 National Championship Regatta the UW Varsity 8 set the American Collegiate record of 5 minutes, 21.482. Ojserkis was named to the 2012 1st Team All Pac-12 rowing team his senior year.

Off the water, Ojserkis was awarded for academics. He was named 2012 Pac-12 Scholar-Athlete of the Year. He was also named to the Pac-10 All-Academic Rowing Team in 2010, 2011, and 2012. In 2012, Ojserkis joined Phi Beta Kappa.

After graduating in 2012, Ojserkis coxed the American Under-23 National Team 8+ to a World Championship in Trakai, Lithuania.

At Cambridge, Ojserkis competed in the 2013 BNY Mellon Boat Race as a reserve for Cambridge's Goldie crew. He attended Judge Business School.

On the American Rowing Team, Ojserkis’ highlights included a bronze medal at the 2015 Pan American Games in Toronto, along with 2 Bronze Medals at a 2015 & 2016 World Rowing World Cup. Ojserkis’ last competitive race was the 2016 Olympics in Rio de Janeiro, where he placed 4th.

References

External links
 

1990 births
Living people
Alumni of the University of Cambridge
American male rowers
Mainland Regional High School (New Jersey) alumni
Olympic rowers of the United States
Rowers at the 2016 Summer Olympics
People from Galloway Township, New Jersey
People from Linwood, New Jersey
University of Washington College of Arts and Sciences alumni
Pan American Games medalists in rowing
Pan American Games bronze medalists for the United States
Rowers at the 2015 Pan American Games
Medalists at the 2015 Pan American Games